The Bavarian Circle was an Imperial Circle of the Holy Roman Empire.

The most significant state by far in the circle was the Duchy of Bavaria (raised to an Electorate by Emperor Ferdinand II in 1623) with the Upper Palatinate territories. Other Imperial Estates like the Prince-Archbishopric of Salzburg, the Prince-Bishoprics of Freising, Passau and Regensburg as well as the Imperial city of Regensburg, seat of the Imperial Diet from 1663, had a secondary importance. The elector of Bavaria and the archbishop of Salzburg acted as the circle's directors.

Composition 
The circle was made up of the following states:

External links 
 Imperial Circles in the 16th Century – Historical Maps of Germany

References 

 
Circles of the Holy Roman Empire
History of Bavaria
1500s establishments in the Holy Roman Empire
1500 establishments in Europe